This article is a list of notable individuals who were born in and/or have lived in Shawnee, Kansas.

Arts and entertainment

 Danni Boatwright, winner of Survivor: Guatemala
 Sukhdarshan Dhaliwal (1950–2015), poet
 Ken Ferguson (1928–2005), ceramist 
 Chris Porter (born 1979), comedian
 Alexis Railsback (born 1995), Miss Kansas USA 2015

Business
 Linda Cook (born 1958), energy industry executive

Politics

National
 Julie Myers (born 1969), Assistant Secretary of Homeland Security for Immigration and Customs Enforcement

State
 Charles H. Akers (1857–1924), Secretary of Arizona Territory
 Nick Jordan (born 1949), Kansas state legislator, Secretary of Revenue
 Jason Kander (born 1981), Missouri Secretary of State
 Phill Kline (born 1959), Attorney General of Kansas, Kansas state legislator
 Mary Pilcher-Cook (born 1954), Kansas state legislator
 John Rubin (born 1948), Kansas state legislator
 Shawn Womack (born 1972), Arkansas judge and state legislator

Sports
 Jeff Andra (born 1975), baseball pitcher
 Johnny Carver (born 1995), sports author
 Dave Doeren (born 1971), football head coach, North Carolina State
 Bryan Goebel (born 1961), professional bowler
 Bob Grim (1930–1996), baseball pitcher; lived and died in Shawnee
 Ed Hearn (born 1960), baseball catcher
 Brian Smith (born 1989), football linebacker
 Ryan Torain (born 1986), football running back
 Sean Wheelock, Bellator MMA television commentator
 Gary Woodland (born 1984), professional golfer

See also
 Lists of people from Kansas
 List of people from Johnson County, Kansas

References

Shawnee, Kansas
Shawnee